Vedaratnam Appakutti Pillai was an Indian freedom fighter, social worker and the co-founder of Kasturba Gandhi National Memorial Trust, a non profit non governmental organization working for the welfare of women in the rural areas of Indian state of Tamil Nadu.

Born into a family of salt merchants in the state of Tamil Nadu to A. Vedaratnam, a freedom activist, he contributed to the efforts of his father to found Kasturba Gandhi Kanya Gurukulam, a rural residential school for girls from financially challenged families, at Vedaranyam, in Nagapattinam district of the state. The establishment has grown over the years to house a printing school, electronics and computer training school and an incense manufacturing unit. The Government of India awarded him the fourth highest civilian honour of Padma Shri in 1989.

See also

References

Recipients of the Padma Shri in social work
Year of birth missing
Year of death missing
People from Nagapattinam district
Indian independence activists from Tamil Nadu
Social workers from Tamil Nadu